Phước Thành is a former province of Southeast region in South Vietnam. It was formed in 1959 from Tân Uyên, Biên Hòa and part of Phước Long province, Long Khánh, Bình Dương province. Province capital was Phước Vĩnh. In 1965 Phú Giáo District of the Phước Thành was dissolved into Bình Dương Province. On July 6, 1965, rest of the province was dissolved.

Districts 
 Tân Uyên
 Hiếu Liêm
 Phú Giáo

Former provinces of Vietnam
Provinces of South Vietnam
Southeast (Vietnam)